Bihara is a village in the outskirts of Silchar Town in Cachar district of Assam. This village is known for some of major Religious center in the area namely.

Bihara Railway station is situated in Chandranathpur, Assam. Station code of Bihara is BHZ. Here are some trains that are passing through Bihara railway station like Ghy Scl Pass, Scl Ghy Pass, Ghy-scl Special, Scl-ghy Special, and many more.

Villages in Cachar district